This is a list of episodes from Battle B-Daman.

Season 1

Season 2 (Battle B-Daman: Fire Spirits!) 

Battle B-Daman